Arkwright is an unincorporated community in Bibb County, in the U.S. state of Georgia.

History
The community was named after Preston S. Arkwright, an electric utilities official. An early variant name was "Holton".

References

Unincorporated communities in Bibb County, Georgia